Paran is a village in Chelav Rural District, in the Central District of Amol County, Mazandaran Province, Iran. At the 2006 census, its population was 86, in 20 families.

References 

Populated places in Amol County